List of members of the 2nd Jatiya Sangsad This is a list of Members of Parliament (MPs) elected to the 2nd Parliament of the Jatiya Sangsad, the National Parliament of Bangladesh, by Bangladeshi constituencies. The list includes both MPs elected at the 1979 general election, held on 18 February 1979, and nominated women's members for reserved seats and those subsequently elected in by-elections.

Members

Elected members of parliament

Members of the Reserved Women's Seat

References 

Members of the Jatiya Sangsad by term
2nd Jatiya Sangsad members
Lists of legislators by term